Chris Andreucci (born 16 November 1998) is a Scottish country music singer/songwriter. Andreucci has released one album and is currently signed to Century Music Group in Nashville, Tennessee. His current releases include: "Strangers In A Bar", "Killin' Time" which reached #1 in the UK iTunes Charts, "Freedom", "Talk to Me", and "Masterplan (Reno)".

Early life 
Andreucci was born and raised in Ayr, Scotland and has been performing since childhood. While attending Belmont Academy, Andreucci regularly took part in musical activities, including various vocal groups, bands and musical theatre. Later, he attended the University of Strathclyde where he regularly played live around the city of Glasgow. During his degree, Andreucci went on exchange to the University of North Carolina at Greensboro (UNCG)  and during this period of time he fell in love with country music.

Music 
Andreucci released his first single, "Talk to Me", in June 2018. Later that year, he released his second single, "Nothing in the World". In December 2018, Andreucci released his debut album, The Opener, recorded and produced by Paul McInally. In 2019 during his exchange trip in North Carolina, Andreucci released his first EP, A Traveller's Tale.

Andreucci signed a publishing deal with Century Music Group in May 2019 while playing a writer's round in Nashville. His first label EP, What Don't Kill You, was released in December 2020.

Andreucci headlined at Celtic Connections at the Glasgow Royal Concert Hall to a sell-out crowd. He was also added to the C2C: Country to Country bill at the SSE Hydro in Glasgow alongside Luke Combs, Brett Young, and Tanya Tucker. Due to the COVID-19 pandemic, the C2C festival was postponed to 2021.

On 1 April 2020 Andreucci released a two-song live EP titled Caledonia. The EP includes a cover of Dougie MacLean's "Caledonia", and a live bonus track titled "Town Called Misery".

December 2020 brought the long-awaited EP "What Don't Kill You", recorded with Century Music Group in Nashville, TN. The six song album was released on the 21st.

After a year of no live music and recording, Andreucci returned to the scene with his third studio single "Killin' Time" on July 16, 2021. Co-written with Conner Edmunds of Bailer Music Publishing and produced by CÄLLEN Sounds, the track adopts a new sound for the Scotsman which was received very well with the new single debuting at #1 on the UK iTunes Charts. Andreucci later signed a new publishing deal with Bailer Music Publishing.

In August 2022 Andreucci released his fourth studio single Strangers In A Bar, co-written by John Haywood and Carver Partin. This single carved out a new sound for the Scotsman who worked closely with producers Jimmy Mansfield and Paul Rogers of Red Giraffe Recordings Nashville.

Capital FM: Country Take Over 
In May 2020, Andreucci spent a full week as the guest on Capital FM Scotland. Over the week Andreucci was challenged every day by presenter Katy J to perform a live country version of a song requested by listeners. Andreucci performed country covers of "Ladbroke Grove"by AJ Tracey, "Blinding Lights" by The Weeknd, "What a Man Gotta Do" by Jonas Brothers, "Savage" by Megan Thee Stallion, and "Birthday" by Anne-Marie. These appearances soon became known as the Country Take Over.

American-Scottish Foundation 

The American-Scottish Foundation (ASF) has been a big supporter of Andreucci and his musical journey. The singer/songwriter appeared regularly on the ASF podcasts throughout 2020, with his songs Masterplan (Reno) and Most Of Our Time being played. On St. Andrews day 2020, the ASF released the first 'Sounds From Scotland' compilation album, showcasing the works of ten Scottish artists. Andreucci was selected to be part of this album, with Masterplan (Reno) and Most Of Our Time being placed as the first two tracks on the album.

Discography 
Studio Albums

Extended Plays

Singles

Appears On

References 

1998 births
Living people
Scottish country musicians